Gian-Carla Coppola (born January 1, 1987) is an American film director and screenwriter. She is a granddaughter of Francis Ford Coppola, the daughter of Jacqui de la Fontaine and Gian-Carlo Coppola, and the niece of Roman Coppola and Sofia Coppola.

Early life
Coppola is the daughter of film producer Gian-Carlo Coppola and Jacqui de la Fontaine. Her father died in a speed boating incident while her mother was pregnant with her.

The credits of the 1996 film Jack, directed by her grandfather Francis Ford Coppola, include the dedication "for gia 'When you see a shooting star...'" (with her name stylized in lower case). She was close in age to the characters in the film at the time.

Peter Getty, son of Gordon Getty, became her stepfather when he married her mother in 2000. They separated in 2009. Coppola grew up in both Los Angeles and the Coppola family vineyard in Napa Valley. Coppola spent much of her childhood on the sets of her aunt Sofia Coppola's films. Coppola worked as a staff assistant in the costume department in Sofia Coppola's Somewhere, and as a creative consultant in Francis Ford Coppola's Twixt.

Coppola dropped out of high school (Archer School for Girls) and subsequently earned her GED. After attending community college, Coppola studied photography at Bard College in New York. After attending Bard College, Coppola stated that she "felt a little burnt out on taking pictures after years of churning out so many for classes". This resulted in her turning to film as a medium of interest.

Career

Beginnings
Coppola's film career began when she directed a short film for her friend's fashion label. Subsequently, Coppola was hired to make short films for Opening Ceremony which starred Kirsten Dunst and Jason Schwartzman (her father's cousin), Zac Posen (who said that "she’s going to be the next Coppola force to be reckoned with"), Diane Von Furstenberg, Rodarte, and Elle China.

Palo Alto

Coppola made her directorial feature film debut with Palo Alto, an adaption of James Franco's short story collection of the same name. The film premiered in the Orizzonti section of the 70th Venice International Film Festival, as well as the 38th Toronto International Film Festival and the Telluride Film Festival in Colorado. After befriending James Franco, Coppola was asked to adapt and direct his collection of short stories Palo Alto. She said she agreed to do the project because of how well she connected with the source material. When working on the film, she drew inspiration from films such as American Graffiti, Fast Times at Ridgemont High, The Outsiders, and The Virgin Suicides. Coppola collaborated with her teenage cast to write the script. Many parallels have been drawn between Coppola's debut and Sofia Coppola's The Virgin Suicides, in terms of the style and genre.

In December 2013, it was announced that distributor Tribeca Film had picked up the film for distribution, and it was released theatrically on May 9, 2014. The film was released on DVD in the United States on September 9, 2014.

Mainstream 

In May 2019, Coppola began filming Mainstream, for which she co-wrote the script with Tom Stuart. The film, starring Andrew Garfield, Maya Hawke and Jason Schwartzman, follows three lovers who struggle to preserve their identities as they form an eccentric love triangle within the modern internet age.

Filmography
 Palo Alto (2013)
"You're Not Good Enough" by Blood Orange (2014)
"Your Type" by Carly Rae Jepsen (2015)
"Cut to the Feeling" by Carly Rae Jepsen (2017)
"Applaud" by Yves Tumor (2019)
"Are You A Magician?" by Soko (2020)
Mainstream (2020)

See also
Coppola family tree

References

External links

American people of Italian descent
Gia
People of Campanian descent
People of Lucanian descent
Living people
1987 births
Bard College alumni
American women film directors
Writers from Los Angeles
American women screenwriters
Film directors from Los Angeles
Screenwriters from California